Kalemera Rwaka Ntagara was Mwami of the Kingdom of Rwanda in the early 1500s C.E. He was one of the sons of King Ndahiro V Cyamatare.

16th-century monarchs in Africa
Rwandan kings